Sunil Deodhar (born 29th September 1965) is the National Secretary of the Bhartiya Janata Party. He is a former RSS pracharak, and son of Marathi journalist Vi Na Deodhar.  He was campaign manager for Narendra Modi in Varanasi  constituency in 2014. He founded an NGO My Home India  of North-East India.

References

Living people
1965 births
Bharatiya Janata Party politicians from Maharashtra